Azerrail Baku is an Azerbaijani women's volleyball club based in Baku. Azerrail is a three-time champion of Azerbaijan Superleague and the winner of CEV Cup in 2002 and Challenge Cup in 2011.

History
Azerrail was founded in 2001 in Baku, Azerbaijan. Under the management of head coach Faig Garayev, Azerrail soon established itself as one of the top clubs in Europe. In 2002, Azerrail won CEV Cup after beating OK Jedinstvo Užice in the final. Azerrail also became the base club for the Azerbaijan national team, producing players such Natalya Mammadova, Valeriya Mammadova, Oksana Kurt, Yelena Parkhomenko and Polina Rahimova.

The team continued to compete in European tournaments in the 2000s and 2010s. In 2011, Azerrail won the CEV Women's Challenge Cup after beating Lokomotiv Baku in the all Azerbaijani final.

After the establishment of Azerbaijan Superleague in 2008, Azerrail had a strong rivalry with Rabita Baku. In the 2015-2016 season, Azerrail won the Superleague title for the first time and earned the title again in 2018 and 2019. In the 2021-2022 season, Azerrail continues to compete in the Superleague along with Absheron, Murov and UNEC teams.

Current squad
Season 2021-2022

Previous Squads

Honours

Domestic Success
  Azerbaijan Superleague:
  Winners (3): 2015-16, 2017-18, 2018–19
  Runners-up (5): 2008–09, 2010–11, 2012–13, 2016-17, 2021-22

International Success
  CEV Cup:
 Winner: 2001-02
  Challenge Cup
 Winner: 2010-11

Notes

References

External links
Official website of Azerrail Baku
Volleyball in Azerbaijan

Azerbaijani volleyball clubs
Volleyball clubs established in 2000
2000 establishments in Azerbaijan
Sports teams in Baku